The 1947 Michigan State Spartans football team represented Michigan State College as an independent during the 1947 college football season. The team compiled a 7–2 record and outscored opponents 167 to 101. Clarence Munn was the first-year head coach, Ralph H. Young was the athletic director, and Robert McCurry was the team captain.  The three assistants (Duffy Daugherty, Forest Evashevski, Kip Taylor) were all future head coaches.

In December 1946, after Charlie Bachman resigned, Michigan State hired Munn as its head football coach. Munn had been the head coach at Syracuse in 1946 and had previously been the line coach at Michigan for seven years. In their first season under Munn, the Spartans achieved their most successful since the 1937 team finished 8–2.

The Spartans began the Munn era with a 55–0 loss to in-state rival 1947 Michigan team. The Spartans' only other setback was a narrow 7 to 6 loss to Bear Bryant's Kentucky Wildcats. In intersectional play, the Spartans beat Mississippi State (7–0), Washington State (21–7), Santa Clara (28–0), Temple (14–6), and Hawaii (58–19). The Hawaii game was played in Honolulu with Bud Crane scoring four touchdowns for the Spartans. The team's 58 points against Hawaii was its highest total since 1932.

At the end of the 1947 season, Tommy Devine wrote in the Detroit Free Press that Munn had "restored athletic 'peace' to Michigan State." At the team's post-season banquet, Robert McCurry was selected to serve another year as the team's captain, and end Warren Huey was named the team's most valuable player and recipient of the Governor of Michigan award.

Schedule

Players
From the 1947 team, 32 players and the student manager received varsity letters for their contributions to the team. The players who received varsity letters are:

 Don Arnson, Muskegon
 Ed Bagdon, guard, Detroit
 Ken Balge, end, Detroit
 Mark Blackman, Jackson
 Jim Blenkhorn, fullback, Saginaw
 Carl Cappaert, Clare
 Cornelius Carrigan, East Pittsburgh, PA
 Lynn Chandnois, halfback, Flint
 Bud Crane, Highland Park
 Henry Ferris, Utica, NY
 Pete Fusi, tackle, Flint
 Hal Gasser, Birmingham
 John Gilman, Clinton
 Russ Gilpin, Detroit
 Gene Glick, quarterback, Saginaw
 George Guerre, halfback, Flint
 Warren Huey, end, Punxsutawney, PA
 Bob Krestel, quarterback, Swissvale, PA
 Don Mason, guard, Wayne
 Bob McCurry, center, Lewistown, PA
 Carl Nestor, Chicago
 Rex Parsell, Flint
 John Poloncak, halfback, Chicago
 Barney Roskopp, Mt. Clemens
 Steve Sieradzki, halfback, Muskegon
 George Smith, Wayne
 Horace Smith, Jackson
 Ed Sohacki, Detroit
 Bill Spiegel, Birmingham
 Hal Vogler, tackle, Detroit
 Frank Waters, fullback, Wallingford, CT
 Jim Zito, tackle, Geneva, OH

Frank O. May of Dearborn was the student manager.

Coaching staff
 Clarence Munn, head coach
 Duffy Daugherty, line
 Forest Evashevski, backfield
 Kip Taylor, ends

Game summaries

Michigan

On September 27, Michigan State opened the season with a non-conference game against Michigan. Playing in Ann Arbor in front of 73,115 spectators, the Wolverines defeated the Spartans, 55–0. The game was the first as head coach of the Spartans for "Biggie" Munn, who had been an assistant coach at Michigan from 1938 to 1945. Michigan dominated the game, outgaining Michigan State 504 yards to 56. Michigan head coach Fritz Crisler played second, third, and fourth string players later in the game, using 37 players in all. Bob Chappuis ran for three touchdowns and threw a touchdown pass for another.

References

External links
 Game program: Michigan State at Washington State, October 11, 1947 

Michigan State
Michigan State Spartans football seasons
Michigan State Spartans football